Sony Pictures Entertainment Motion Picture Group (commonly known as Sony Pictures Motion Picture Group, formerly known as the Columbia TriStar Motion Picture Group until 2013, and abbreviated as SPMPG) is a division of Sony Pictures Entertainment to manage its motion picture operations. It was launched in 1998 by integrating the businesses of Columbia Pictures Industries, Inc. and TriStar Pictures, Inc.

History 
The Sony Pictures Motion Picture Group was launched in 1998 as the Columbia TriStar Motion Picture Group, as a current division of Sony Pictures Entertainment, owned by Sony. It has many of Sony Pictures' current motion picture divisions as part of it. Its divisions at that time were Columbia Pictures, TriStar Pictures, Triumph Films, Sony Pictures Classics, and Sony Pictures Releasing.

On December 8, 1998, SPE resurrected its former animation and television division Screen Gems as a film division of Sony Pictures Entertainment's Columbia TriStar Motion Picture Group that has served several different purposes for its parent companies over the decades since its incorporation.

In 2002, Columbia TriStar Television was renamed as Sony Pictures Television. The last three remaining companies, with the "Columbia TriStar" brand in its name, were Columbia TriStar Home Entertainment, the Columbia TriStar Motion Picture Group, and Columbia TriStar Marketing Group. Columbia TriStar Home Entertainment and Columbia TriStar Film Distributors became Sony Pictures Home Entertainment and Sony Pictures Releasing International in 2004 and 2005 and Columbia TriStar Motion Picture Group became the second-to-last subsidiary of Sony Pictures Entertainment to use the "Columbia TriStar" brand name in its name.

In 2013, TriStar Productions was launched, as a joint venture of Sony Pictures Entertainment and former 20th Century Fox chairman Thomas Rothman.

In October 2013, Sony Pictures renamed its motion picture group as the "Sony Pictures Motion Picture Group". Sony Pictures Animation and Sony Pictures Imageworks were moved from Sony Pictures Digital to its motion picture group.

On June 2, 2016, Doug Belgrad had announced he was to step down as president of the SPMPG and would transition his role to producer at the studio. Belgrad was promoted as president of the SPMPG back in 2014.

On July 15, 2019, former Fox 2000 Pictures president Elizabeth Gabler and the entire Fox 2000 staff joined Sony Pictures Entertainment and formed 3000 Pictures with the motion picture group. HarperCollins would be funding half of the division's overhead and development. 3000 Pictures would also pursue projects for TV and streaming.

Film divisions

Sony Pictures Releasing 

Sony Pictures Releasing is an American film distributor owned by Sony. Established in 1994 as a successor to Triumph Releasing Corporation, the company handles theatrical distribution, marketing and promotion for films produced and released by Sony Pictures Entertainment, including Columbia Pictures, TriStar Pictures (as well as TriStar Productions), Screen Gems, Sony Pictures Classics, Sony Pictures Animation, Crunchyroll, Stage 6 Films, Affirm Films, Destination Films, and Triumph Films. It is a member of the Sony Pictures Motion Picture Group. It also has an international division called Sony Pictures Releasing International, which from 1991 until 2005 was known as Columbia TriStar Film Distributors International.

International arrangements 

From 1971 until the end of 1987, Columbia's international theatrical distribution operations were a joint venture with Warner Bros. named Columbia-Warner, and in some countries, this joint venture also distributed films from other companies like with EMI Films and Cannon Films in the UK under the names of Columbia-EMI-Warner and later Columbia-Cannon-Warner. The UK venture was dissolved in 1988.

On February 6, 2014, Columbia TriStar Warner Filmes de Portugal Ltda., a joint venture with Warner Bros. which distributed films from both companies in Portugal, announced that they will close their offices on March 31. Sony Pictures' films are distributed in Portugal by Big Picture Films since then, while NOS Audiovisuais took over the distribution duties for Warner Bros. films in the country.

From June 2014 until February 2020, Sony Pictures' Philippine releasing arm under the name of Columbia Pictures Philippines distributed films by United International Pictures' partner studios, Paramount Pictures and Universal Pictures (including films by Metro-Goldwyn-Mayer), after UIP ended its nine-year distribution agreement with the studio's local distributor Solar Entertainment Corporation and their Solar Films subsidiary. The Philippine distribution to films made by Universal lasted until January 2020; when distribution reverted to Warner Bros. (UIP's former local distributor from the 1990s to 2000) in October 2021 while most Focus Features titles are instead released through a start-up online distribution company, UPSTREAM. Paramount later renewed their distribution agreements with Sony in October 2021.

The theatrical distribution of Sony Pictures' films in Italy is still handled by Warner Bros. One notable example of this is Call Me By Your Name, where Warner Bros. handled Italian theatrical distribution (although the Sony label is still being used) while home video distribution went through Sony itself. The agreement, however, will expire in 2023 as local distributor Eagle Pictures took over theatrical distribution of Sony's films in the country.

Sony Pictures and Walt Disney Studios formed a film distribution joint venture in Southeast Asia in 1997. By December 2006, 14 joint distribution ventures between Sony Pictures Releasing International and Walt Disney Studios Motion Pictures were formed and exist in countries including Brazil, Mexico, Singapore, Thailand and the Philippines. In January 2007, their 15th such partnership began operations in Russia and CIS. In February 2017, Sony starting leaving the Southeast Asia venture with the Philippines. In August 2017, Sony terminated the joint venture agreement for their own operations. On January 31, 2019, in anticipation of Disney's then-pending acquisition of most 21st Century Fox assets (including 20th Century Fox), it was agreed that Disney would sell its stake in the Mexican joint venture named Walt Disney Studios Sony Pictures Releasing de México to Sony Pictures Releasing. As part of the global economic fluctuations caused by the Disney's acquisition, Sony Pictures Production and Release LLC and Disney Studios LLC parted amicably signing a formal demerger on 21 January 2020. The contract would allow Sony Pictures Releasing to operate autonomously.

In Argentina and Poland, United International Pictures handles theatrical distribution of films released by Sony Pictures.

In the Netherlands, Universal Pictures International currently handles theatrical distribution of films released by Sony Pictures since 2013.

In the Netherlands and Sweden, Columbia TriStar Films (now known as Sony Pictures Releasing) formerly handled theatrical distribution of films released by 20th Century Fox from 1992 to 1997 in the former country and from 1994 to 1996 in the latter.

Film library

Film series

Highest-grossing films

References

External links 
 Sony Pictures Movies

American companies established in 1998
 
Film distributors of the United States
Film production companies of the United States
Entertainment companies based in California
Sony Pictures Entertainment
Companies based in Culver City, California
Entertainment companies established in 1998
Mass media companies established in 1998
1998 establishments in California
Multinational companies
Sony subsidiaries